Dragnet, the radio series, premiered on NBC on June 3, 1949, and ended on February 26, 1957. A set of 314 original episodes aired between June 1949 and September 1955 with ".22 Rifle For Christmas" and "The Big Little Jesus" usually re-run during Christmas time.
Re-runs were broadcast from the end of September 1955 to February 1957. The vast majority of the episodes are available free on various sites around the Internet.

1949 season

1950 season

1951 season

1952 season

1953 season

1954 season

1955 season

1956 season

1957 season

References

Sources
John Dunning, On The Air: The Encyclopedia of Old-Time Radio, Oxford University Press, 1998, .

radio
Lists of radio series episodes